The 1967 Oklahoma State Cowboys football team represented Oklahoma State University–Stillwater in the Big Eight Conference during the 1967 NCAA University Division football season. In their fifth season under head coach Phil Cutchin, the Cowboys compiled a 4–5–1 record (3–4 against conference opponents), tied for fifth place in the conference, and were outscored by opponents by a combined total of 140 to 123.

On offense, the 1967 team averaged 12.3 points scored, 165.9 rushing yards, and 100.6 passing yards per game.  On defense, the team allowed an average of 14.0 points scored, 188.2 rushing yards, and 94.5 passing yards per game. The team's statistical leaders included Jack Reynolds with 643 rushing yards, Ronnie Johnson with 494 passing yards, Terry Brown with 425 receiving yards, and Larry Gosney with 36 points scored.

Back Harry Cheatwood was selected by the Central Press Association as a first-team All-American. Cheatwood and lineman Jon Kolb were selected as first-team All-Big Eight Conference players.

The team played its home games at Lewis Field in Stillwater, Oklahoma.

Schedule

References

Oklahoma State
Oklahoma State Cowboys football seasons
Oklahoma State Cowboys football